Benajuy may refer to:
 Benajuy-ye Gharbi Rural District
 Benajuy-ye Sharqi Rural District
 Benajuy-ye Shomali Rural District